Northampton is a borough in Northampton County, Pennsylvania. Its population was 10,395 as of the 2020 census.

The borough is part of the Lehigh Valley metropolitan area, which had a population of 861,899 and was thus the 68th most populous metropolitan area in the U.S. as of the 2020 census.

History
Northampton and surrounding areas of the Lehigh Valley are rich in limestone, which is commonly used in the production of cement. The Atlas Portland Cement Company, based here from 1895 to 1982, was the world's largest cement company at one time, and one of dozens in the area. It produced some 8 million barrels of cement for construction of the Panama Canal, most of what was used on the project. Atlas was bought by another company in 1980 and ceased operation here in 1982; its last smokestack here was demolished in 1993. Today technology and automation mean that the cement industry can manufacture a great amount of product with 150-200 workers, rather than the thousands who worked in these plants earlier in the 20th century.

The Atlas Memorial Cement Museum was opened in 1997 in Northampton. It was founded by Edward Pany, who worked at the company in summers during the 1950s. His father, an immigrant from Austria, worked all his life at Atlas. Immigrant workers from Poland, Ukraine, and other eastern European nations also worked here. The museum commemorates the importance of the cement industry and Atlas Cement to the area.

Geography

The Lehigh River, which separates Northampton County from Lehigh County, forms the borough's western border.

Northampton has a hot summer humid continental climate (Dfa) and average monthly temperatures range from 28.8 °F in January to 73.7 °F in July. The local hardiness zone is 6b.

Government
The governing body consists of a borough manager, an assistant borough manager, and eight council members (two from each ward), who are elected by the residents of the borough.

Demographics

At the 2000 census, there were 9,405 people, 3,869 households, and 2,634 families residing in the borough. The population density was 3,619.1 people per square mile (1,396.7/km2). There were 4,023 housing units at an average density of 1,548.1 per square mile (597.4/km2).  The racial makeup of the borough was 98.21% White, 0.35% African American, 0.05% Native American, 0.44% Asian, 0.39% from other races, and 0.55% from two or more races. Hispanic or Latino of any race were 1.74%.

There were 3,869 households, 30.3% had children under the age of 18 living with them, 53.3% were married couples living together, 10.3% had a female householder with no husband present, and 31.9% were non-families. 27.4% of households were made up of individuals, and 14.3% were one person aged 65 or older. The average household size was 2.40 and the average family size was 2.92.

In the borough, the population was spread out, with 22.4% under the age of 18, 5.8% from 18 to 24, 32.2% from 25 to 44, 21.0% from 45 to 64, and 18.6% 65 or older. The median age was 39 years. For every 100 females there were 91.4 males. For every 100 females age 18 and over, there were 86.1 males. The median household income was $40,982 and the median family income was $49,482. Males had a median income of $37,033 versus $26,422 for females. The per capita income for the borough was $19,516. About 1.3% of families and 3.7% of the population were below the poverty line, including 1.4% of those under age 18 and 5.9% of those age 65 or over.

History
Northampton was created from the villages of Siegfried, Newport and Stemton, which together were formed into an alliance in 1902.

Due to the limestone formations in the region, Northampton became a global center for the manufacturing of cement. Atlas Portland Cement Company, the largest such company in the world at one time, operated here from 1895 to 1982. It supplied most of the cement used in the construction of the Panama Canal.

In 1909, Atlas petitioned county courts to change the alliance into a borough, reportedly because the change would make it easier for the company to send and receive mail. The Atlas Portland Cement Company plant closed in 1982. Borough residents, many of them former Atlas employees or their descendants, still identify strongly with the company and its history. For example, the Northampton Area School District mascot is the "Konkrete Kid." In addition, in 1996 the Atlas Memorial Cement Museum was opened in the borough. Historical community events included the Northampton Jack Frost Parade every October before Halloween, celebrating the onset of winter. It includes marching bands and floats.

During the 1940s and 1950s, Northampton hosted the Northampton County Fair, which was held annually and spread out across the Lappawinzo Fish and Game Club property north of Northampton off Kreidersville Road. There were large numbers of vendor stands, fair rides, animals, shows, performances, 4-H Club judgings, and Ringling Brothers and Barnum and Bailey shows. Visitors came from all over the East Coast during the two-week event and hourly buses ran from downtown Northampton and nearby cities to the Fair.

In popular culture
Part of the opening sequence of the 1992 film School Ties was filmed in downtown Northampton due to the town's preservation of older buildings, which fit with the 1950s setting of the film.

Transportation

Pennsylvania Route 329 is the only numbered highway serving Northampton. It follows Twenty-first Street along a southwest-northeast alignment through the middle of the borough.

Public education
The borough is served by the Northampton Area School District.  Students in grades nine through 12 attend Northampton Area High School in the borough. There are four elementary schools and one middle school.

The borough is also home to Good Shepherd Catholic School in the 4th Ward. It serves grades Pre-K to 8th grade. It is part of the Diocese of Allentown.

Museums
Atlas Cement Memorial Museum, based in Northampton

Notable person
Dorothy Page, former actress

Sister city
 Stegersbach, Austria

References

External links

Official website

Boroughs in Northampton County, Pennsylvania
Boroughs in Pennsylvania
Populated places established in 1867
Ukrainian communities in the United States